This is a list of electoral districts or ridings in Canada for the Canadian federal elections of 1908 and 1911. It includes the creation of the provinces of Alberta and Saskatchewan whose districts were re-aligned in 1907. The Northwest Territories did not return any members.

Electoral Districts are constituencies that elect Members of Parliament in Canada's House of Commons every election.

Nova Scotia – 18 seats
Annapolis
Antigonish
Cape Breton South
Colchester
Cumberland
Digby
Guysborough
Halifax*
Hants
Inverness
Kings
Lunenburg
North Cape Breton and Victoria
Pictou
Richmond
Shelburne and Queen's
Yarmouth

Prince Edward Island – 4 seats
King's
Prince
Queen's*

New Brunswick – 13 seats
Carleton
Charlotte
City and County of St. John
City of St. John
Gloucester
Kent
King's and Albert
Northumberland
Restigouche
Sunbury—Queen's
Victoria
Westmorland
York

Quebec – 65 seats
Argenteuil
Bagot
Beauce
Beauharnois
Bellechasse
Berthier
Bonaventure
Brome
Chambly—Verchères
Champlain
Charlevoix
Châteauguay
Chicoutimi—Saguenay
Compton
Dorchester
Drummond—Arthabaska
Gaspé
Hochelaga
Huntingdon
Jacques Cartier
Joliette
Kamouraska
L'Assomption 
L'Islet
Labelle
Laprairie—Napierville
Laval
Lévis
Lotbinière
Maisonneuve
Maskinongé
Mégantic
Missisquoi
Montcalm
Montmagny
Montmorency
Nicolet
Pontiac
Portneuf
Quebec County
Quebec East
Quebec West
Quebec-Centre
Richelieu
Richmond—Wolfe
Rimouski
Rouville
Shefford
Town of Sherbrooke
Soulanges
St. Anne
St. Antoine
St. Hyacinthe
St. James
St. Johns—Iberville
St. Lawrence
St. Mary
Stanstead
Témiscouata
Terrebonne
Three Rivers and St. Maurice
Two Mountains
Vaudreuil
Wright
Yamaska

Ontario – 86 seats
Algoma East
Algoma West
Brant
Brantford
Brockville
Bruce North
Bruce South
Carleton
Dufferin
Dundas
Durham
Elgin East
Elgin West
Essex North
Essex South
Frontenac
Glengarry
Grenville
Grey East
Grey North
Grey South
Haldimand
Halton
Hamilton East
Hamilton West
Hastings East
Hastings West
Huron East
Huron South
Huron West
Kent East
Kent West
Kingston
Lambton East
Lambton West
Lanark North
Lanark South
Leeds
Lennox and Addington
Lincoln
London
Middlesex East
Middlesex North
Middlesex West
Muskoka
Nipissing
Norfolk
Northumberland East
Northumberland West
Ontario North
Ontario South
Ottawa (City of)*
Oxford North
Oxford South
Parry Sound
Peel
Perth North
Perth South
Peterborough East
Peterborough West
Prescott
Prince Edward
Renfrew North
Renfrew South
Russell
Simcoe East
Simcoe North
Simcoe South
Stormont
Thunder Bay and Rainy River
Toronto Centre
Toronto East
Toronto North
Toronto South
Toronto West
Victoria
Waterloo North
Waterloo South
Welland
Wellington North
Wellington South
Wentworth
York Centre
York North
York South

Manitoba – 10 seats
Brandon
Dauphin
Lisgar
Macdonald
Marquette
Portage la Prairie
Provencher
Selkirk
Souris
Winnipeg

Saskatchewan – 10 seats
Assiniboia
Battleford
Humboldt
Mackenzie
Moose Jaw
Prince Albert
Qu'Appelle
Regina
Saltcoats
Saskatoon

Alberta – 7 seats
Calgary
Edmonton
Macleod
Medicine Hat
Red Deer
Strathcona
Victoria

British Columbia – 7 seats
Comox—Atlin
Kootenay
Nanaimo
New Westminster
Vancouver City
Victoria City
Yale—Cariboo

Yukon – 1 seat
Yukon
*returned two members

1907-1914